Sheila M'Mbijjewe is a Kenyan accountant who has served as the Deputy Governor of the Central Bank of Kenya since 2015.

Background and education
Sheila M'Mbijjew was born in Kenya on 6 March 1958. She holds a bachelor's degree in accounting, from Kingston University, in the United Kingdom. She is also a Chartered Certified Accountant.

Career
She has served as the deputy governor of the Central Bank of Kenya, deputing Patrick Ngugi Njoroge, since 4 August 2015. She was appointed to that position in June 2015.

She has a long history of service in Kenya's private banking sector and financial environment. She has served as a board member in several companies, including Deloitte Touché Kenya, Pricewaterhouse Kenya, the Capital Markets Authority, the Nairobi Stock Exchange, Old Mutual Insurance Company Kenya and the Financial Reporting Centre of Kenya.

Other considerations
In 2008, Sheila M'Mbijjew was awarded the Moran of the Burning Spear (MBS), a presidential medal for service to her country.

See also
 Economy of Kenya

References

External links
 Website of the Central Bank of Kenya

Central Bank of Kenya people
Living people
1958 births
Kenyan accountants
Women accountants
Alumni of Kingston University